The 1910–11 season was the 40th season of competitive football in England.

Overview

Events

Huddersfield Town entered the Football League for the first time. Grimsby Town were the team who made way for them. Brighton & Hove Albion won the Charity Shield as Southern League winners, defeating Football League winners Aston Villa.

Honours

Notes = Number in parentheses is the times that club has won that honour. * indicates new record for competition

League tables

First Division

Second Division

References